Shah Miras (also Romanized as Shāh Mīras) is a village in Ujan-e Gharbi Rural District, in the Central District of Bostanabad County, East Azerbaijan Province, Iran. At the 2006 census, its population was 76, in 15 families.

References 

Populated places in Bostanabad County